OPF Boys College Islamabad is an educational institution located in the centre of Islamabad, Pakistan. The college is run as a project of Overseas Pakistanis Foundation (OPF). The college started functioning on 12 September 2001. The campus is spread over 100 kanals.

Operational setup 
The principal is the head of the institution whereas the Vice Principal coordinates all the college activities as the head of the faculty and the staff. Presently, Anwar Rajput holds the office as the Principal and Professor Javed Iqbal is the Vice Principal of the college.

On the command hierarchy, Section Heads are the next to follow. The college is run on a four section basis:

 Junior Section (VI-VIII Classes) headed by Prof. Jawad Shafi
 Senior Section (IX-X) headed by Prof. Mohsin Ali Abidi
 College Section (XI-XII) headed by Prof. Waheed Aslam Bhatti
 Cambridge Section (O- and A-Levels) headed by Prof. Waheed Aslam Bhati

Academics

The college has a strength of approximately 1400 students where around 250-300 new students are inducted every year. The college functions on an annual system.

Classes VI-VIII and Pre O Level Classes are assessed in the college internal examinations including monthly tests, term examinations and annual examination. Classes IX-XII are assessed by the Federal Board of Intermediate and Secondary Education (FBISE) examination system whereas O-Level and A-Level Classes are evaluated for promotion by Cambridge International Examinations (CIE) examination system.

Functioning of the College

The college uses two different schemes of study, one affiliated with the Federal Board of Intermediate and Secondary Education (FBISE) and the second one run under University of Cambridge Local Examination Syndicate (UCLES).

In addition to the wards of residents of Rawalpindi and Islamabad, the college provides quality educational facilities to the male children of overseas Pakistanis from class VI to HSSC and CIE O- as well as A-Level.

Activities 

Students take part in the diverse co/extra curricular activities initiated by the college societies and clubs. This helps the students in developing traits like confidence and creativity in them. Additionally, annual debates, declamations, quiz competitions, Qirat-Naat Contests and inter-collegiate speech contests in English and Urdu are some of the impressive events of this institution.

Frequent visits by reputable scholars, touring institutions and concerned organizations are also facilitated by the college.

Physical activities, including various indoor and outdoor games for the students are also arranged regularly. Study/excursion trips are also initiated for all the students.

House System

Students from all classes are sorted into four different houses which are named after the leaders of the Pakistan's independence movement. All houses participate in the activities and competitions of the college.

  Sir Syed House
  Iqbal House
  Jinnah House
  Nishter House
  Liaqat House

Leadership

References

External links 
 
 

Intermediate colleges in Pakistan
Cambridge schools in Pakistan
Pakistani diaspora
2001 establishments in Pakistan